Vaarkali or Varkali may refer to several places in Estonia:
Vaarkali, Rõuge Parish, village in Võru County, Rõuge Parish, Estonia
Vaarkali, Võru Parish, village in Võru County, Võru Parish, Estonia